Ethel Davey (sometimes credited as Grace Davey) was an English film editor active primarily in the 1920s and 1930s. She was married to English actor Robert Atkins.

Selected filmography 

 Clipped Wings (1937)
 Contra la Corriente (1935)
 Get That Man (1935)
 Guilty Parents (1934)
 Jaws of Justice (1933)
 The Wyoming Whirlwind (1932)
 The Racing Strain (1932)
 The Face on the Barroom Floor (1932)
 Outlaw Justice (1932)
 Sinister Hands (1932)
 The Cheyenne Cyclone (1931)
 The Phantom (1931)
 The Hurricane Horseman (1931)
 Hell's Valley (1931)
 Red Fork Range (1931)
 Breed of the West (1930)
 Trails of Danger (1930)
 The Carnation Kid (1929)

References 

British women film editors
English film editors
1885 births
1972 deaths